Rocky Run is a stream in the U.S. state of Wisconsin. It is a tributary to the East Fork Black River.

Rocky Run was so named on account of its rocky character.

References

Rivers of Wood County, Wisconsin
Rivers of Wisconsin